The 5th edition of the annual TNT - Fortuna Meeting took place on June 15 and June 16, 2011 in Kladno, Czech Republic. The track and field competition, featuring a decathlon (men) and a heptathlon (women) event was part of the top-level 2011 IAAF World Combined Events Challenge.

Men's Decathlon

Schedule

June 15 

June 16

Records

Results

Women's Heptathlon

Schedule

June 15 

June 16

Records

Results

See also

2011 Decathlon Year Ranking
2011 World Championships in Athletics – Men's decathlon
2011 World Championships in Athletics – Women's heptathlon

References

 Official results at www.iaaf.org
 Official results at www.desetibo-kladno.cz
 Procházka, Michal (2010-06-14). The focus on Sebrle and Chernova in Kladno – PREVIEW - IAAF Combined Events Challenge. IAAF. Retrieved on 2010-06-22.
 Procházka, Michal (2010-06-16). Chernova and Draudvila the overnight leaders in Kladno – IAAF Combined Events Challenge. IAAF. Retrieved on 2010-06-22.
 Procházka, Michal (2011-06-17). Chernova impresses with 6773pts tally in Kladno – IAAF Combined Events Challenge. IAAF. Retrieved on 2011-06-22.

2010
TNT - Fortuna Meeting
TNT - Fortuna Meeting